The Brazil women's national basketball team won the 1994 FIBA World Championship for Women in Australia.

Achievements

Olympic Games
 1992 – 7th place
 1996 – 2nd place 
 2000 – 3rd place 
 2004 – 4th place
 2008 – 11th place
 2012 – 9th place
 2016 – 11th place
 2020 – Did not qualify

FIBA World Championship

FIBA AmeriCup
 1989 – 2nd place 
 1993 – 2nd place 
 1997 – 1st place 
 1999 – 2nd place 
 2001 – 1st place 
 2003 – 1st place 
 2005 – 2nd place 
 2007 – 3rd place 
 2009 – 1st place 
 2011 – 1st place 
 2013 – 3rd place 
 2015 – 4th place
 2017 – 4th place
 2019 – 3rd place 
 2021 – 3rd place

Pan American Games
 1955 – 3rd place 
 1959 – 2nd place 
 1963 – 2nd place 
 1967 – 1st place 
 1971 – 1st place 
 1975 – 4th place
 1979 – 4th place
 1983 – 3rd place 
 1987 – 2nd place 
 1991 – 1st place 
 1999 – 4th place
 2003 – 3rd place 
 2007 – 2nd place 
 2011 – 3rd place 
 2015 – 4th place
 2019 – 1st place

Team

Current roster
Roster for the 2021 FIBA Women's AmeriCup.

Notable players
 Hortência Marcari
 Maria Paula Silva
 Janeth Arcain
 Silvinha
 Leila Sobral
 Marta Sobral
 Alessandra Oliveira
 Helen Luz
 Érika de Souza
 Adriana Moisés Pinto
 Damiris Dantas do Amaral
 Iziane Castro Marques

See also
 Brazil women's national under-19 basketball team
 Brazil women's national under-17 basketball team
 Brazil men's national basketball team
 Brazil women's national 3x3 team

References

External links
 
FIBA profile
Latinbasket – Brazil Women National Team
Brazil Basketball Records at FIBA Archive

Bask
Basketball
Women's national basketball teams in South America
Basketball in Brazil